NBU may refer to:

Universities 
 North Bengal University, West Bengal, India
 New Bulgarian University, Sofia, Bulgaria
 Ningbo University, Zhejiang province, China
 Nippon Bunri University, Ōita, Japan
 Northern Borders University, Saudi Arabia

Other
National Bee Unit, a bee research institute in the UK
 National Bank of Ukraine, the central bank of Ukraine
 NetBackup, an enterprise level backup and recovery suite
 National Bank of Uzbekistan, an alternative name for the National Bank for Foreign Economic Activity of the Republic of Uzbekistan
 .nbu (Nokia Backup), a file extension for Nokia mobile phone software
 Národný bezpečnostný úrad, Slovakia's national security authority
 Národní bezpečnostní úřad, Czechia's national security authority
 New British Union, a minor fascist party headed by Gary Raikes